Prayer for the Wild Things is an album released by Paul Winter in 1994. The album was commissioned to accompany a painting by artist Bev Doolittle, which is also titled Prayer For The Wild Things. A portion of this painting is seen on the album cover.

Paul Winter created the album to depict in the listener's mind a journey through a day and night in the Northern Rockies, and based it on "a series of vignettes about the animals, with the saxophone recurring throughout as a kind of interlocutor". After choosing which animals to represent on the album, Winter chose instruments to accompany each animal that he felt represented that animal in some way. To demonstrate how all of these animals are interconnected in life, the melodies played on these instruments were written so that they could all be interwoven.

Paul traveled around the area of the Northern Rockies during the creation of this album, during which he went to a number of National Parks and played improvised duets with many of the animals in the parks. These duets were recorded, and many of them were put on the album as well.

The album won the Grammy for best new age album in 1995.

Track listing
 "Eagle Mountain" (Winter)
 "Round Dance" (Neskahi)
 "On the River" (Winter)
 "Buffalo Prairie" (Winter)
 "Osprey" (Winter)
 "Grizzly Bear Cubs with Their Mom After Breakfast" (Friesen, Haddad, Winter)
 "Tritones in the Canyon" (Winter)
 "Moose Walk" (Velez, Winter)
 "Gates of the Mountain" (Winter)
 "Cougar Bassoon" (Urbinato)
 "Antelope Dreams of Her African Cousins" (Winter)
 "Afternoon's End" (Velez, Winter)
 "Sunset on Eagle Mountain" (Winter)
 "White Goat of the Rockies" (Friesen, Winter)
 "Loon on Mud Pond" (Winter)
 "Night Voices"
 "Elk Horns" (Clark, Winter)
 "North Fork Wolves in the Midnight Rain" (Winter)
 "Night into Dawn" (Winter)
 "Dance of All Beings" (Neskahi)
 "Eagle Mountain" (Winter)

Personnel
 Paul Winter – soprano saxophone
 John Clark – French horn
 Randy Wolfgang – English horn
 Mark Perchanok – heckelphone
 John Urbinato – bassoon
 Dennis Smylie – contrabass clarinet
 Paul Halley – pipe organ
 Eugene Friesen – cello
 Gordon Gottlieb – percussion
 Jamey Haddad – percussion
 Glen Velez – percussion
 Arlie Neskahi and the White Eagle Singers

Animals of the Rocky Mountains
The calls of birds and mammals from the Rocky Mountains were used as part of the album. Animals included in the album are:
Elk
Bison
Grizzly bear
Loon
Mountain lion
Bald eagle
Osprey
Antelope
Canada goose
Wolf
Raven
American bittern
White-tailed deer
Coyote
Boreal owl
Golden eagle
Sandhill crane
Hermit thrush
Trumpeter swan
Whooping crane
Uphill sandpiper
Ruffled grouse
Greater prairie chicken
Willow ptarmigan
Belted kingfisher
Swainson's thrush
Western meadowlark

The recordings of animal calls along with saxophone solos were recorded at Gates of the Mountains, Glacier National Park, and Yellowstone National Park.

References
" Living Music.

1994 albums
Paul Winter albums
Grammy Award for Best New Age Album
Living Music albums